The Maryland Comptroller election of 2018 was held on November 6, 2018, to elect the Comptroller of Maryland. Incumbent Democratic Comptroller Peter Franchot filed for re-election to a third term on October 5, 2017, and was unopposed for the Democratic nomination. Anjali Reed Phukan became a candidate under the Republican Party on April 20, 2017, and was unopposed for the Republican nomination. Franchot won re-election with 72.1% of the vote.

This is the first time since 2010 that the Democratic candidate won a majority of counties for any statewide elected office.

Democratic primary

Candidates

Declared
 Peter Franchot, incumbent Comptroller

Declined
 Maggie McIntosh, state delegate
 Joseline Peña-Melnyk, state delegate and candidate for MD-04 in 2016
 James Rosapepe, state senator

Results

Republican primary

Candidates

Declared
 Anjali Reed Phukan

Results

General election

Results

See also
 2018 United States elections
 2018 Maryland gubernatorial election

References

Comptroller
Maryland
Maryland comptroller elections